The 2011 Indy Grand Prix of Alabama was the second race of the 2011 IZOD IndyCar Series season. The race took place on April 10, on the  road course in Birmingham, Alabama, and was telecast by Versus in the United States.

Classification

Qualifying
 All cars were split into two groups of twelve, with the fastest six from each group going through to the "top 12" session. In this session, the fastest six cars progressed to the "Firestone Fast Six." The fastest driver in the final session claimed pole, with the rest of the cars lining up in session order, regardless of qualifying times. (fast six from 1–6, top 12 from 7–12 and round 1 from 13 to 24, with group 1 drivers occupying the odd–numbered grid positions, and group 2 drivers occupying the even–numbered grid positions.

Race

Championship standings after the race
Drivers' Championship standings

 Note: Only the top five positions are included.

References

External links 
IndyCar Results Page

Grand Prix of Alabama
Indy Grand Prix of Alabama
Indy Grand Prix of Alabama
Indy Grand Prix of Alabama